Döchin Myangat United or simply DMU is a Mongolian football club, competing in the Mongolia First League.

References

Football clubs in Mongolia